Wyoming Highway 94 (WYO 94) is a  north–south Wyoming State Road located in southern Converse County south of Douglas.

Route description
Converse County Route 5 takes over the roadway to Esterbrook. WYO 94 heads north towards Douglas, and parallels the North Platte River for much of its length. Nearing the city, WYO 94 briefly parallels Interstate 25 and U.S. Routes 20/26/87 as Highway 94 meets the eastern terminus of Wyoming Highway 91 (Cold Springs Road). WYO 94 passes under the interstate as it enters the city limits, and shortly thereafter reaches its northern end at an intersection with I-25 BUS/US 20 BUS/US 26 BUS/US 87 BUS (W. Yellowstone Highway), and the southern terminus of Wyoming Highway 59 at approximately 16.6 miles.

Major intersections

References

 Official 2003 State Highway Map of Wyoming

External links 

 Wyoming State Routes 000-099
WYO 94 - Converse CR 5 to WYO 91
WYO 94 - WYO 91 to I-25 Bus/US 20 Bus/US 26 Bus/US 87 Bus/WYO 59

Transportation in Converse County, Wyoming
094